Amy Sarig King (born March 10, 1970) is an American writer of short fiction and young adult fiction.

Biography 
Amy Sarig King (born March 10, 1970) is an American writer of young adult novels, middle grade novels, short fiction, and works for younger readers. She is the recipient of the 2022 Margaret A. Edwards Award for her "significant and lasting contribution to young adult literature.”
King was born and grew up outside of Reading, Pennsylvania. She graduated from Exeter Township Senior High School in 1988, earned a degree in photography at The Art Institute of Philadelphia, and then moved to Dublin, Ireland, where she began writing novels in 1994. After two years in Dublin, she relocated to Tipperary, where she renovated a farm and taught literacy to adults. She returned to Pennsylvania in 2004 and published her first novel, The Dust of 100 Dogs, in 2009, after fifteen years of writing.

Career
King is the author of numerous young adult books that have earned her recognition as "one of the best YA writers working today" by The New York Times Book Review. Her work is known for bridging the gap between young adult and adult readers. She also writes acclaimed middle grade novels under her full name, Amy Sarig King. Her short fiction for adults has been widely published and nominated for Best New American Voices.

Teaching, presentations, and public appearances
A.S. King is a faculty member of the Writing for Children and Young Adults MFA program at Vermont College of Fine Arts. An experienced teacher and presenter, King spends many months of the year traveling the U.S. for school visits, conferences, workshops, and literary festivals. King devotes much of her time and platform to mental health advocacy. In her presentations, she often centers topics such as life skills, emotions, bullying, self-esteem, safe relationships, and trauma.

Awards and recognition
King has won numerous awards, including the 2011 Michael L. Printz Award Honor for Please Ignore Vera Dietz, the 2013 Los Angeles Times Book Prize for Ask the Passengers, and the 2020 Michael L. Printz Award for Dig. In 2015, she was named the "Outstanding Pennsylvania Author" for that year by the Pennsylvania School Librarians Associations; all of her novels are set in the state. King is also the recipient of the 2022 Margaret A. Edwards Award, which recognizes an author and "a specific body of his or her work, for significant and lasting contribution to young adult literature". Many of her works have been contenders for book awards or have been named to annual booklists.

The Dust of 100 Dogs
 2009 Cybils Awards finalist
 2010 ALA Best Books for Young Adults listing

Please Ignore Vera Dietz
 2010 Junior Library Guild listing
 2011 ALA Best Fiction for Young Adults listing
 2011 Michael L. Printz Award honor book
 2011 Edgar Award finalist

Monica Never Shuts Up
 2010 Best New American Voices 2010, Short Fiction nomination

Everybody Sees the Ants
 2011 Cybils Awards finalist
 2011 Junior Library Guild listing
 2011 Andre Norton Award finalist
 2012 ALA Top Ten Best Fiction for Young Adults listing
 2012 ALA Best Fiction for Young Adults listing

Ask the Passengers
 2012 Junior Library Guild listing
 2012 Lambda Literary Award finalist
 2012 ALA Rainbow List Top Ten selection
 2012 Library Journal Best YA Books for Adults
 2012 Publishers Weekly Best Children's Fiction Books of 2013
 2012 Kirkus Reviews "Best Teen Books of 2012" listing
 2013 ALA Best Fiction for Young Adults listing

Reality Boy
 2013 Kirkus Reviews "Best Teen Books of 2013" listing
 2013 Publishers Weekly Best Children's Fiction Books of 2013
 2014 ALA Best Fiction for Young Adults listing

Glory O'Brien's History of the Future
 2014 Kirkus Reviews "Best Teen Books of 2014" listing,
 2014 Cybils Awards finalist
 2015 Andre Norton Award finalist
 2014 Publishers Weekly Best Young Adult Books of 2014
 2015 ALA Best Fiction for Young Adults listing
 2015 ALA Top Ten Amazing Audiobooks for Young Adults listing, Glory O'Brien's History of the Future as read by Christine Lakin
 New York Times Editor's Choice
 A Junior Library Guild Pick for Fall 2014
 ABA Best Book 2014
 A Winter 2014/15 Indie Next Pick
 An ABC 2014 Best Book
 A School Library Journal Best Book of 2014
 New York Public Library Best Books for Teens 2014
 The Boston Globe's Best YA Novels of 2014
 BookPage Best Teen Books of 2014
 Bustle.com Top 25 Young Adult Novels of 2014
 Holiday Book Selections: Los Angeles Times and Chicago Tribune
 Booklist Editors' Choice 2014
 Nominee for 2015 Indie Choice Book of the Year – Young Adult
 The Cooperative Children's Book Center at the University of Wisconsin- CCBC Choices 2015 list
 Capitol Choices 2015 list
 ABA 2015 Young Adult Honor Award
 2015 Amelia Elizabeth Walden Award
 NAIBA's YA 2015 Book of the Year
 PALA Carolyn Field Honor award

I Crawl Through It
 iTunes Best 25 Books of September
 B&N 20 Most Anticipated September YAs
 A Junior Library Guild Selection
 Booklist Editors' Choice 2015
 The Horn Book Magazine's 2015 Fanfare List
 Bookpage's Best Children's and Teen's Books of 2015
 Booklist 50 Best YA Books & Audio of All Time list

Still Life with Tornado
 2017 NAIBA Best Book – Young Adult Literature
 A 2016 New York Times Notable Children's Book
 A News & Observer Best Book of 2016
 A Publishers Weekly Best Book of 2016
 A School Library Journal Best Book of 2016
 A Booklist Best Book of 2016
 Booklist Top of the List 2016
 A Shelf Awareness Best Book of 2016
 A BookPage Best Teen Book of 2016
 A Bustle Top 30 YA Book of 2016
 A Nerdy Book Club Best YA of 2016
 A Bank Street College Best Children's Book of the Year
 NAIBA Young Adult Book of the Year Award Winner 2017

Me and Marvin Gardens
 Spring 2017 Kids' Indie Next List selection
 Washington Post's Best Children's Books of 2017 selection
 Chicago Public Library Best of the Best Books of 2017 selection
2018-2019 Texas Bluebonnet Award Master List selection
 2018-2019 Pennsylvania Young Readers Choice Awards nominee
 2019 Rebecca Caudill Young Readers Book Award nominee

Dig
 Winner of the 2020 Michael L. Printz Award 
Finalist for the 2019 L.A. Times Book Prize in the Young Adult Literature Category
 SLJ Best of the Year
 Horn Book 2019 Fanfare
 A YALSA 2020 Amazing Audiobooks for Young Adults Top Ten selection
 A CCBC Choices 2020 selection 
 An ALSC 2020 Notable Children's Books list selection

The Year We Fell from Space
 Horn Book 2019 Fanfare
 A Bulletin of the Center for Children's Books 2019 Blue Ribbon selection
 A CCBC Choices 2020 selection 
 An ALSC 2020 Notable Children's Books list selection

Switch
 YALSA 2022 Best Fiction for Young Adults
 BookPage Best Young Adult Books of 2021 (ranked #1)
 Chicago Public Library Best Teen Fiction of 2021

Works

 The Dust of 100 Dogs (2009, Flux)
 Please Ignore Vera Dietz (2010, Knopf)
 Everybody Sees the Ants (Oct. 2011, Little, Brown)
 Ask the Passengers (Oct. 2012, Little, Brown)
 Monica Never Shuts Up (Dec. 2012, The Bat Press)
 Reality Boy (Fall 2013, Little, Brown)
 Glory O'Brien's History of the Future (October 2014, Little, Brown)
 I Crawl Through It (Sept. 2015, Little, Brown)
 Still Life with Tornado (Fall 2016, Dutton Children's Books)
Me And Marvin Gardens (2017, Arthur A. Levine Books)
Dig (March 26, 2019, Dutton Children's Books)
The Year We Fell From Space (October 2019, Arthur A. Levine Books)
Switch (May 2021, Dutton Children's Books)
Attack of the Black Rectangles (Scholastic Press, 2022)

Anthology Contributions
 Dear Bully: 70 Authors Tell Their Stories (Sep. 2011, HarperTeen)
 Break These Rules: 35 YA Authors on Speaking Up, Standing Out, and Being Yourself (Sep. 2013, Chicago Review Press)
 Losing It (2013, Carolrhoda LAB)
 One Death, Nine Stories (2014, Candlewick)

References

External links 

 
 
 

1970 births
Living people
21st-century American novelists
American children's writers
American women novelists
Writers from Reading, Pennsylvania
American young adult novelists
American women children's writers
21st-century American women writers
Women writers of young adult literature
Novelists from Pennsylvania